Douglas Alan Miller (October 29, 1969 – July 21, 1998) was a professional American football linebacker in the National Football League (NFL). Miller played in 23 games for the San Diego Chargers from 1993 to 1994. He died in 1998 after being struck by lightning twice in Colorado.  He was there to participate in a charity golf tournament and to go camping with a friend.

References

1969 births
1998 deaths
American football linebackers
San Diego Chargers players
South Dakota State Jackrabbits football players
Sportspeople from Cheyenne, Wyoming
People from Meade County, South Dakota
Players of American football from South Dakota
Deaths from lightning strikes
Accidental deaths in Colorado